Brampton Islands is a national park in the Mackay Region, Queensland, Australia,  northwest of Brisbane. The park covers much of Brampton Island and all of Carlisle Island.

The park features rainforests, sandy beaches and coral reefs. Walks exist to the summit and a circuit around the whole island. The 8.7 km circuit track leads visitors through open eucalypt forests, vine thickets, dry rainforests, grasslands and mangroves.

Camping is permitted on Carlisle Island which has some facilities. Marine stingers are found in the waters of the park between October and May.

One of the most striking features of the national park is Brampton Peak, which rises 214 meters above sea level.

Of the mammals in the park, koalas are represented, coastal sheath-tailed bat and black flying-fox.

See also

 Protected areas of Queensland

References

External links
Official Site

National parks of Queensland
Protected areas established in 1968
North Queensland